Dael Jonathan Fry (born 30 August 1997) is an English professional footballer who plays as a centre-back for  club Middlesbrough.

Fry has represented England at under-17, under-18, under-19, under-20 and under-21 levels. He has won the 2014 UEFA European Under-17 Championship, 2017 FIFA U-20 World Cup and 2018 Toulon Tournament with his country.

Early life
Born in Middlesbrough, North Yorkshire, Fry was scouted by Middlesbrough F.C. after being spotted playing for his local side Cleveland Juniors at the age of 7. Throughout the ranks of the Middlesbrough youth team, Fry made an impression with his progress at the academy. In October 2014, Fry signed his first professional contract with the club.

Club career
Fry made his first-team debut for Middlesbrough on 9 August 2015 at the age of 17, on the opening day of the 2015–16 Championship season – playing from the start and was named man of the match in a 0–0 draw against Preston North End. On 14 September, he signed a new five-year contract with Middlesbrough. Following an injury to Daniel Ayala, manager Aitor Karanka gave Fry a chance to cover in Ayala's absence and played his first Middlesbrough match in months on 15 February 2016 in a 0–0 draw against Leeds United. After the match, Karanka praised Fry's performance. Fry made a handful of appearances between 15 February and 13 March 2016. Although he returned to the bench later in the 2015–16 season, Fry went on to make eight appearances in all competitions.

On 31 August 2016, Fry joined Rotherham United on loan until the end of the 2016–17 season. Fry made his debut on 10 September, playing the whole game in a 2–2 draw against Bristol City. Fry made 10 starts for the club before the loan was terminated early on 1 January 2017, having not featured for the club since November. After his loan spell at Rotherham came to an end, Fry only made two appearances for Middlesbrough in the 2016–17 season, which both came in the FA Cup against Accrington Stanley and Manchester City. Earlier in the 2016–17 season, Fry signed a long-term contract with the club, contracting him until June 2021.

Fry scored his first goal for Middlesbrough on 23 February 2021 in a 3–1 loss to Bristol City.

International career
Fry made his debut for the England national under-17 team on 28 January 2014, coming on as a second-half substitute, in a 2–1 win over Belgium. He was a member of the England under-17 squad that won the 2014 UEFA European Under-17 Championship, beating the Netherlands 4–1 in a penalty-shoot-out in the final.

Fry was called up to the under-18 team and made his debut on 3 September 2014 in a 4–1 win over the Netherlands.

After a year with the under-19 team, Fry was called up by the under-20 team in August 2016. He made his under-20 debut on 1 September in a 1–1 draw against Brazil. Fry was also a member of the England under-20 squad that won the 2017 FIFA U-20 World Cup in South Korea.

Fry was part of the under-21 team that won the 2018 Toulon Tournament.

Career statistics

Honours
England U17
UEFA European Under-17 Championship: 2014

England U20
Tournoi Under-20 Four Nations: 2017
FIFA U-20 World Cup: 2017

England U21
Toulon Tournament: 2018

Individual
Toulon Tournament Best XI: 2018

References

External links

Profile at the Middlesbrough F.C. website

1997 births
Living people
Footballers from Middlesbrough
English footballers
Association football defenders
Middlesbrough F.C. players
Rotherham United F.C. players
English Football League players
England youth international footballers
England under-21 international footballers